Wolf Burchard is a British-German art historian and museum curator. He joined the Metropolitan Museum of Art in New York City in 2019, where he is responsible for British decorative arts.

Life and career

Burchard held curatorial positions at the Royal Collection Trust (2009-2014) and the National Trust (2015-2018). In 2014, he co-organized the exhibition The First Georgians: Art and Monarchy, 1714-1760, shown at the Queen's Gallery, Buckingham Palace to mark the tercentenary of the Hanoverian succession. At the National Trust, he oversaw the digital cataloguing of the trust's collection of 55,000 pieces of furniture.

He is the curator of Inspiring Walt Disney: The Animation of French Decorative Arts (2021), the Metropolitan Museum of Art's first ever exhibit devoted to Walt Disney, which was subsequently shown at the Wallace Collection in London and the Huntington Museum in San Marino, California. Burchard led the 22 million dollar renovation of the Met's British Galleries, of which the re-opening marked the museum's 150th anniversary.

Burchard was born and raised in Paris, France. He read history of art and architecture at the universities of Tübingen, Vienna and the Courtauld Institute of Art in London, from which he holds an MA and PhD.

Publications

The Sovereign Artist: Charles Le Brun and the Image of Louis XIV, Paul Holberton Publishing, London 2016
Inspiring Walt Disney: The Animation of French Decorative Arts, The Metropolitan Museum of Art and Yale University Press, New York and New Haven 2021
"Royal Remains" (What’s the point of rebuilding Germany’s palaces?), Apollo: The International Art Magazine (March 2016): 146-152
"Game of Thrones" (Royal Thrones through the Ages), Apollo: The International Art Magazine (March 2018): 162-166 
"Don’t Pull the Rug From Under Our Feet!" (Historic Carpets in English Country Houses), Country Life (December 2018): 190-194
"Nation of Shopkeepers: A Very Brief History of British Decorative Arts", The New British Galleries: The Metropolitan Museum of Art Bulletin (Spring 2020): 5-29

Burchard is a regular contributor to Apollo Magazine, The Art Newspaper and Furniture History.

Personal life
Wolf Burchard is the great nephew of modernist architect and Bauhaus founder Walter Gropius and the brother of film and theatre actresses Marie Burchard and Bettina Burchard.

References

External links
Met Museum Staff Profile

Living people
German art historians
British art historians
People associated with the Metropolitan Museum of Art
British art curators
Year of birth missing (living people)